Cuthbertson High School is a moderately sized high school in Waxhaw, North Carolina a part of Union County Public Schools. It was founded in August, 2009 under the administration of the then principal, Robert Jackson. The school was founded by pulling students from other area high schools including Parkwood High School, Marvin Ridge High School and Weddington High School. Its main feeder schools are New Town Elementary and Kensington Elementary. Cuthbertson High School is a recognized Honor School of Excellence in North Carolina. Honors for Cuthbertson High School include NC Accountability Model: Exceeded Growth, Graduation Rates: 98.5% for 2017–18 and UCPS International School: 2010; 2011; 2012; 2013; 2014; 2015

The current principal is Jeffery Stout

Education 

The school offers a wide range of classes at Honors and AP level. Advanced courses are offered in the areas of English, Math, Science, Social Studies, World Language, and Career and Technical Education, the Arts, and Physical Education. Eighth grade students also have the option of participating in the Career and College program. Cuthbertson's partnership with South Piedmont Community College offers college level courses through the program. Juniors and seniors have the opportunity to take community college classes through this dual enrollment program. The school also offers several classes based on global affairs and foreign language courses in German, Spanish, Chinese, French.

Extracurricular activities 

Cuthbertson High School has several social, athletic and fine arts organizations. These include three concert bands, the ‘Mighty Marching Cavalier’ marching band, jazz band, indoor percussion and winter guard units, and a rock band.

Athletics
Cuthbertson has many Varsity and Junior Varsity Sports during the fall, winter and spring season. These include Cheerleading, Cross Country, Dance Team, Football, Golf, Soccer, Tennis, Volleyball, Basketball, Swim Team, Winter Track, Wrestling, Baseball, Lacrosse, Softball and Track & Field.

Cuthbertsons men's soccer team won the 2A state championship in the 2012–2013 season.
The Cuthbertson women's indoor track team won the 2017 3A indoor state title, the first 3A state title and track title in school history. The girls cross country team won the school's first 3A state title on November 3, 2018. The Cuthbertson women's cross country team was the 2016 3A state runners-up.
The Cuthbertson women's indoor track and field team won the 2018 3A indoor state title. This was Cuthbertson's second team state title, making the women's team back-to-back state.

References

Public high schools in North Carolina
Schools in Union County, North Carolina